Anonymous Rex is a 2004 science fiction film directed by Julian Jarrold and starring Sam Trammell and Daniel Baldwin. The film was produced as a "backdoor pilot" for an unproduced television series of the same name. It is based on the novel Casual Rex by Eric Garcia. It was aired on Sci Fi Channel.

Plot

In an alternate timeline, dinosaurs have managed to survive the KT Extinction Event and now live amongst humans using disguises. Vincent Rubio is a Velociraptor private investigator along with his partner, Ernie Watson, a Triceratops.

When Ernie's ex-girlfriend's brother is found dead, the incident is dismissed as suicide. However she doesn't believe her brother would kill himself and asks Ernie to investigate ("for free," Vincent observes). When the pair investigate the crime scene, Vincent notices the scent of another dinosaur on the windowsill, concluding it was not a suicide.

At the funeral Vincent talks to a man dressed in a strange suit who belongs to the cult that the deceased had previously joined, "The Voice of Progress." He pretends to be interested in their ideals and gets himself and Ernie invited to a gathering. During the funeral, Vincent detects the same scent from the victim's bedroom, indicating the killer is nearby.

Vincent and Ernie go to the cult meeting where they are told the Voice of Progress' ideals and history: The Voice of Progress is revealed to be both the title of their leader and a collection of dinosaurs who believe that the prolonged use of disguises has robbed the dinosaur community of its unique identity. The cult also believes that humans have caused dinosaurs to see themselves as monsters and humans as normal. While Ernie appears indifferent to the cult's ideals, Vincent is profoundly impacted by the cult's beliefs.

As their investigation continues, Vincent and Ernie come to realize what one man in the cult is planning: a dinosaurian revolution by turning cult members into violent, feral dinosaurs and releasing them on the humans. The resulting conflict will force both sides to face each other, and allow dinosaurs to reveal themselves. Though Vincent is somewhat sympathetic to the cult, he disagrees with the idea of a violent revolution (knowing it could end in disaster for both sides), leaving him unsure which side he's on.

Cast
 Sam Trammell as Vincent Rubio
 Daniel Baldwin as Ernie Watson
 Stephanie Lemelin as Gabrielle Watson
 Tamara Gorski as Circe
 Alan van Sprang as Raal
 Isaac Hayes as Elegant Man
 Faye Dunaway as Shin

Dinosaurs featured
Velociraptor
Triceratops
Carnotaurus
Brontosaurus 
Stegosaurus
Tyrannosaurus
Allosaurus

Production
The pilot was originally produced for the Fox network, but was picked up by the Sci-Fi Channel instead.

See also 
 List of American films of 2004
 Eric Garcia

References

External links 
 
 http://www.goodreads.com/series/58143-anonymous-rex

2004 television films
2004 films
American science fiction television films
Films about dinosaurs
2004 science fiction films
2004 fantasy films
Syfy original films
Films directed by Julian Jarrold
Films shot in Toronto
Television films as pilots
Television pilots not picked up as a series
Films based on American novels
Television shows based on American novels
2000s English-language films
2000s American films